Management audit is a systematic examination of decisions and actions of the management to analyse the performance. Management audit involves the review of managerial aspects like organizational objective, policies, procedures, structure, control and system in order to check the efficiency or performance of the management over the activities of the company. Unlike financial audits, management audit mainly examine the non financial data to audit the efficiency of the management. Somehow audit tries to search the answer of how well the management has been operating the business of the company? Is managerial style well suited for business operation? Management Audit focuses on results, evaluating the effectiveness and suitability of controls by challenging underlying rules, procedures and methods.

Management Audit is an assessment of methods and policies of an organization's management in the administration and the use of resources, tactical and strategic planning, and employee and organizational improvement. Management Audit is generally conducted by the employee of the company or by the independent consultant and focused on the critical evaluation of management as a team rather than appraisal of individual.

Objectives 
 Establishing the current level of effectiveness
 Suggest Improvement
 Lay down standards for future performance
 Increased levels of service quality and performance
 Guidelines for organizational restructuring
 Introduction of management information systems to assist in meeting productivity and effectiveness goals
 Better use of resources due to program improvements.
 To identify the weaknesses and inefficiencies of management in different functional areas, such as production, sales, finance etc.
 To analyses the different ways to overcome the inefficiencies, or weaknesses.
 To critically review the organization structure.
 To evaluate the ways for improving the management efficiency and to select the best are the some of the objectives of management audit.
It helps the management providing suggestions to attain goal of an organization
it ensure sound objective

Audit procedures 
Generally auditor deploy following audit procedures to conduct the management audit.
 Questionnaire
 Interview with employee and managers
 Analyzing MIS and internal Business reports
 Checking quality of business and its impact on P & L

See also
Audit
Internal audit
Risk-based auditing

References

Types of auditing
Organizational performance management